Aspet (Aspetes in contemporary Greek) was a hereditary military title of the Armenian nobility, usually found within the Bagratuni family.

The name has been derived from either the Old Persian *viθa/visapati "head of the clan", or in more likelihood aspapati, later aspbed (or aspbad) which designated the Iranian office of Master of the Horse (commander of the cavalry). The Armenian army was comprised overwhelmingly of cavalry, under the command of the High Constable (sparapet), this left no room for a Master of the Horse. There are hardly any references by Armenian historians of the Arshakuni period to any Bagratids in command of the king's forces. Like the małxaz of the Khorkhoruni family, aspet seems to have been a special, gentilitial, title of the Bagratunis, who derived from it their other, short-lived, name of Aspetuni. This title disappears following the Arab conquest of Armenia. The existence of this title and name may possibly be due to Arsacid Armenia's imitation of Parthia, where one of the Seven Great Houses bore the name of Aspahbad.

The name of the Aspietai, a Byzantine noble family of Armenian origin, is derived from aspet.

In modern Armenian historiography, the word aspet also refers to medieval European knights.

References

Further reading 
 

Armenia
Armenian noble titles
Armenian military ranks of Parthian origin